Phlegmacium kytoevuorii is a species of fungus in the family Cortinariaceae.

Taxonomy 
It was originally described in 2014 by the mycologists Tuula Niskanen and Kare Liimatainen who classified it as Cortinarius kytoevuorii. It was placed in the (subgenus Phlegmacium) of the large mushroom genus Cortinarius.

In 2022 the species was transferred from Cortinarius and reclassified as Phlegmacium kytoevuorii based on genomic data.

Etymology 
The specific epithet honours Finnish mycologist Ilkka Kytövuori.

Habitat and distribution 
Found in coniferous forests of Finland and Sweden.

See also
List of Cortinarius species

References

External links

kytoevuorii
Fungi described in 2014
Fungi of Finland
Fungi of Sweden